Quarter Ton Class is an offshore sailing class of the International Offshore Rule racing the Quarter Ton Cup between 1967 and 1996 and from 2005 till now. The class is sailed by smaller keelboats of similar size and is likely the world's most produced keelboat class.

History
This sailing class has held world championships from 1967 until 1997. In 2005 there was a revival of the quarter ton class started in Cowes and they sailed under IRC Quarter Ton Cup rules from 2005 until now.

An annual Dutch Quarterton Cup under ORC was started in 2013. In France and Ireland there are also races for Quarter Ton boats.

Boats

Accent 26
Albin 79
Cal T/4
D&M 22
Ericson 25
Farr 727
Northern 1/4 Ton
North Star 500
Ranger 23
San Juan 24
Santana 525
Tanzer 22
Yamaha 26
Yankee 26

See also
Mini Ton class
Half Ton class
Three-Quarter Ton class
One Ton class
Midget Ocean Racing Club

References

Development sailing classes
Keelboats